Lopatcong Creek is a  tributary of the Delaware River in Warren County, New Jersey in the United States.

The source of the stream is Scotts Mountain in Harmony Township. It was one of the chief water sources for the Morris Canal, in particular from Inclined Plane 9 West in Port Warren to Lock 10 West in the Green's Bridge section of Phillipsburg.

The Lopatcong joins the Delaware in Phillipsburg. The name of the creek is derived from the Lenni Lenape — Lowan peek achtu onk, which meant "winter watering place for deer," or "at the swift river".

See also
List of rivers of New Jersey

References

External links
 
 
 

Tributaries of the Delaware River
Rivers of Warren County, New Jersey
Rivers of New Jersey